The EuroCup Women 2009–10 was the eighth of FIBA Europe's second-tier international competition for women's basketball clubs under such name, running from 11 November 2009 to 8 April 2010. Athinaikos AS defeated Nadezhda Orenburg in the final to become the first Greek team to win the competition.

Preliminary round

Group A

Group B

Group C

Group D

Group E

Group F

Group G

Group H

Group I

Group J

Group K

Round of 32

Round of 16

Quarter-finals

Semifinals

Final

References

EuroCup Women seasons
2009–10 in European women's basketball leagues